HLA-DR1 (DR1) is a HLA-DR serotype that recognizes the DRB1*01 gene products. It has been observed to be common among centenarians.

Serology

The serology for the most common DR1 alleles is excellent.

Disease associations

By serotype
DR1 is associated with seronegative-rheumatoid arthritis, penicillamine-induced myasthenia, and schizophrenia. DR1 is increased in patients with systemic sclerosis and arthritis and in ulcerative colitis with patients that have articular manifestations.

By allele
DRB1*0101 is associated with rheumatoid arthritis, in anti-Jk(a) mediated hemolytic transfusion reactions, foliaceous pemphigus, HTLV-1-associated myelopathy/tropical spastic paraparesis, and  lichen planus. In lyme disease arthritis, *0101 appears to play a role in
presentation of triggering microbial antigens.

DRB1*0102 is associated with rheumatoid arthritis, in anti-Jk(a) mediated hemolytic transfusion reactions,  psoriasis vulgaris, and recurrent respiratory papillomatosis

DRB1*0103 is associated with colonic Crohn's disease and ulcerative colitis.

By genotype
DRB1*0101/*0404 and *0101/*0401 increases risk of mortality in rheumatoid arthritis, with ischemic heart disease and smoking. these same genotypes are associated with rheumatoid vasculitis.

By haplotype
DRB1*0102:DQB1*0501 is associated with psoriasis vulgaris and tubulointerstitial nephritis & uveitis syndrome, but is relatively protective against juvenile diabetes.

DR1-DQ5 is associated with tubulointerstitial nephritis & uveitis syndrome.

Rheumatoid arthritis
DR1 are associated with rheumatoid arthritis, and while not the strongest association with the highest risk for early onset arthritis is within the DR4-bearing Native American population. There frequency of DR4-DQ8 haplotypes reach extreme nodal levels. Arthritis has been identified in a pre-Columbian remains from Italy, the affected individual bearing the DRB1*0101 allele. DRB1*0101 and most DR4 have in common a 'shared epitope'. In this hypothesis a common region of the beta chain, positions 67 to 74, are common and may be integral to presenting auto-immunological peptides.

Genetic linkage

HLA-DR1 is not genetically linked to DR51, DR52 or DR53, but is linked to HLA-DQ1 and DQ5 serotypes.

References

1